Kathryn Morris is an American actress, best known for her lead role as Detective Lilly Rush in the CBS series Cold Case.

Career
Morris's first role was a minor one in the 1991 tele-movie Long Road Home. Several other small parts followed, including a bit part as a psychiatric patient in the Oscar-winning As Good as It Gets. Her breakthrough role came as Lt. Annalisa "Stinger" Lindstrom in the television series Pensacola: Wings of Gold in 1997 for two seasons. Morris continued to work in films (notably ones directed by Rod Lurie) and had a brief stint on the Xena series in 1999 as Najara.

After seeing her in the film The Contender (which DreamWorks distributed), Steven Spielberg cast her in two successive films. Her scenes as a rock star in A.I. Artificial Intelligence, which required Morris to take intensive singing and guitar lessons were cut from the film by the director, which was particularly agonizing for her. In Minority Report, she portrayed the tormented wife of Tom Cruise's character.

In 2003, Morris won the lead role of detective Lilly Rush in the CBS dramatic series Cold Case. She also appeared in the 2004 films Mindhunters and Paycheck, opposite Ben Affleck, and more recently as the journalist wife of Josh Hartnett in Lurie's drama Resurrecting the Champ (2007). Morris appeared in the film Cougars, Inc. which was distributed in 2011. In 2012, Morris appeared the Hallmark Channel movie The Sweeter Side of Life, a romantic comedy.

Personal life
Morris was born in 1969 in Cincinnati, Ohio. She grew up Christian in Windsor Locks, Connecticut, with her parents, Stanley, a Bible scholar, and Joyce, an insurance agent, and five siblings before moving away. From age 6 to 17, Morris and her family traveled the southern 'Bible Belt' as a gospel group called 'The Morris Code'. The group was mainly made up of Morris's father and three (out of five) of her siblings.

She attended two colleges in the Philadelphia area, Northeastern Christian Junior College and Temple University. After studying theatre in high school, she was involved in a hit-and-run collision while on her way to her first acting gig, a Japanese music video based on the musical Grease. She still made it to the gig and that's when she knew she was going to be an actress.

On April 8, 2013, Morris announced that she and her partner Johnny Messner were expecting twins. She gave birth to twin boys, Jameson and Rocco. Jameson and Rocco were diagnosed with autism when they were 3 years old. In October 2021, Morris launched The Savants; an initiative to "revolutionize how the world lives on and off the spectrum".

Filmography

Film

Television

References

External links

Actresses from Cincinnati
American film actresses
American television actresses
Living people
Temple University alumni
20th-century American actresses
21st-century American actresses
Ohio Valley University alumni
People from Windsor Locks, Connecticut
Year of birth missing (living people)
People from Cincinnati